Bucculatrix cidarella is a moth of the family Bucculatricidae. It is found in most of Europe (except the Iberian Peninsula and the Balkan Peninsula), Kazakhstan and Japan (Honshu). It was described in 1839 by Philipp Christoph Zeller.

The wingspan is 8–9 mm. The head is dull ferruginous, mixed with fuscous in middle. Antennal eyecaps white. Forewings are dark fuscous ; two whitish costal spots before middle and at
3/4, and two on dorsum somewhat anterior to these ; cilia ochreous-tinged. Hindwings are grey.
The larva is yellowish -green, anteriorly reddish-tinged; dorsal line darker ; dots whitish
The head is pale brown.

Adults are on wing May to June. At times there is a second generation in August.The larvae create a gallery mine in the leaves of alder, including common alder (Alnus glutinosa), grey alder (Alnus incana), green alder (Alnus viridis) or myrtle (Myrica gale).

References

External links

Swedish Moths
UKmoths
Plant Parasites of Europe
Images representing Bucculatrix cidarella at Consortium for the Barcode of Life

Bucculatricidae
Leaf miners
Moths described in 1839
Moths of Asia
Moths of Europe
Taxa named by Philipp Christoph Zeller